The Lendu Plateau is an area of high ground in the Ituri Province of the Democratic Republic of the Congo (DRC), on the northwest side of Lake Albert.

Location

The Lendu plateau is roughly a rectangle 80 km long and 50 wide, with the long axis in the SW-NE direction. The northeast edge of the plateau roughly coincides with the DRC-Uganda border.

Topography

The altitude of the plateau mostly varies between 1700 m and 2000 m. It rises towards the east to a set of mountains, the highest being Mount Aboro (2455 m).

References

Geography of the Democratic Republic of the Congo